Quantock may mean:

Arts
 "Quantocking" and "Quantocking II", two episodes of Peep Show about visiting the Quantock Hills

Buildings
 Quantock Lodge, a mansion in Somerset, UK

Organisations
 Friends of Quantock, a conservation organisation in the Quantock Hills
 Quantock Motor Services, a bus operator in Somerset, UK

People 
 David E. Quantock, the United States Army Inspector General
 Rod Quantock, Australian comedian

Places 
 Quantock Hills, Somerset, UK
 Quantock Greenway, a path in the Quantock Hills
 Quantock, Saskatchewan
 Vale of Taunton and Quantock Fringes

Ships
 HMS Quantock (L58)